The 2022–2023 mpox outbreak in Israel is a part of the ongoing outbreak of human mpox caused by the West African clade of the monkeypox virus. The outbreak was first reported in Israel on 20 May 2022 when the Health Ministry announced a suspected case which was confirmed on 21 May 2022. One month later, on 21 June, the first locally transmitted case was reported.

Currently, Israel is the most affected country in Asia and the 14th most affected country in the world. Israel was also the first in Asia to report a case.

Background

Transmission 

A large portion of those infected were believed to have not recently traveled to areas of Africa where mpox is normally found, such as Nigeria, the Democratic Republic of the Congo as well as central and western Africa. It is believed to be transmitted by close contact with sick people, with extra caution for those individuals with lesions on their skin or genitals, along with their bedding and clothing. The CDC has also stated that individuals should avoid contact and consumption of dead animals such as rats, squirrels, monkeys and apes along with wild game or lotions derived from animals in Africa.

In addition to more common symptoms, such as fever, headache, swollen lymph nodes, and rashes or lesions, some patients have also experienced proctitis, an inflammation of the rectum lining. CDC has also warned clinicians to not rule out mpox in patients with sexually transmitted infections since there have been reports of co-infections with syphilis, gonorrhea, chlamydia, and herpes.

History

Imported case before the outbreak 
In 2018, an imported case was detected in Israel. A 38-year-old man came from Rivers State, Nigeria in late September. He showed the symptoms of the disease on that month. Later on October the patient sought medical attention at Shaare-Zedek Medical Center in Jerusalem. He was confirmed to be infected with the West African Clade of monkeypox virus that month. All of the patient's contacts were traced and followed up but no virus transmission were detected.

Arrival 

As the outbreak was spreading in Europe in the middle of May 2022, the Israeli Health Ministry reported a suspected mpox case in the country on 20 May. The case was confirmed by testing on 21 May, becoming the first case in Israel during the outbreak.
 
The 30-year-old man returned from Western Europe and contracted the disease from there. The ministry reported that he was in isolation in the Ichilov General Hospital in Tel Aviv.

Spread 
The Ministry of Health reported the first case of community transmission on 21 June 2022.

Timeline

May 2022

June 2022

July 2022

Responses

Cases and Statistics

See also
2022–2023 mpox outbreak
Timeline of the 2022–2023 mpox outbreak
2022–2023 mpox outbreak in Asia
 2022–2023 mpox outbreak in India
2022–2023 mpox outbreak in Europe
 2022–2023 mpox outbreak in France
 2022–2023 mpox outbreak in Germany
 2022–2023 mpox outbreak in the Netherlands
 2022–2023 mpox outbreak in Portugal
 2022–2023 mpox outbreak in Spain
 2022–2023 mpox outbreak in the United Kingdom
2022–2023 mpox outbreak in Canada
2022–2023 mpox outbreak in Peru
2022–2023 mpox outbreak in South Africa
2022–2023 mpox outbreak in the United States
 Mpox in Nigeria
 Mpox in the Democratic Republic of the Congo

Notes

References 

Israel
Mpox
Mpox
2022 disasters in Israel